Tang Xiaoyin (Cantonese: Tong1 Hiu2 Yan1; born 29 April 1985 in Guangzhou, Guangdong) is a female Chinese sprinter who specializes in the 400 metres.

She finished fourth at the 2004 World Junior Championships and won the 2007 Asian Indoor Games.

She represented her country in the 4x400 metres relay event at the 2008 Summer Olympics. She went on to take gold in the same relay event at the 11th Chinese National Games in 2009.

Her personal best time is 52.55 seconds, achieved in August 2006 in Shijiazhuang. In the 200 metres she has 23.61 seconds, achieved in April 2004 in Guilin.

References

 Team China 2008

1985 births
Living people
Athletes (track and field) at the 2008 Summer Olympics
Chinese female sprinters
Olympic athletes of China
Asian Games medalists in athletics (track and field)
Athletes from Guangzhou
Athletes (track and field) at the 2006 Asian Games
Athletes (track and field) at the 2010 Asian Games
Asian Games bronze medalists for China
Medalists at the 2006 Asian Games
Medalists at the 2010 Asian Games
Runners from Guangdong
Olympic female sprinters
21st-century Chinese women